Chesterville Brick House, also known as Goodings Store, Isaac Spencer House and Salter House, is a historic home and former commercial building located at Chesterville, Kent County, Maryland.  It is a -story brick building, thought to have been built about 1773. The building has changed ownership many times. It was originally located on the northwest corner of the intersection of Maryland Route 447 (now Maryland Route 444) and Maryland Route 290, abandoned in 1970, and vandalized prior to being moved in 1973; approximately 250 feet from its original site.

It was listed on the National Register of Historic Places in 1979.

References

External links

, including undated photo, at Maryland Historical Trust

Houses in Kent County, Maryland
Houses on the National Register of Historic Places in Maryland
Houses completed in 1773
Historic American Buildings Survey in Maryland
National Register of Historic Places in Kent County, Maryland